The Khasyn is a river in Magadan Oblast, Russian Far East, a tributary of the Arman.

The name of the river originated in the Even language word "Khesen", meaning "herd".

Course 
It flows initially southwards with many rapids across a mountainous area, bending subsequently to the SSW and holding that direction until its mouth. Finally the Khasyn joins the left bank of the Arman  from its mouth in the Sea of Okhotsk.

Besides of the abandoned village of Karamken, the settlements of Palatka, Khasyn, Stekolny and Splavnaya are located by the banks of the river.

The Khasyn is frozen between October and May. The river is not navigable.

Fauna
The river is a spawning ground for salmon, both freshwater and anadromous, such as the coho salmon. Other fish species in the river are grayling and Dolly Varden char.

See also
List of rivers of Russia

References

External links

Kolyma - Modern Guidebook to Magadan Oblast

Rivers of Magadan Oblast
Drainage basins of the Sea of Okhotsk